Amnonia is a genus of bristle flies in the family Tachinidae. There are at least two described species in Amnonia.

Species
These two species belong to the genus Amnonia:
 Amnonia carmelitana Kugler, 1971 c g
 Amnonia deemingi Zeegers, 2010 c g
Data sources: i = ITIS, c = Catalogue of Life, g = GBIF, b = Bugguide.net

References

Further reading

External links

 
 

Tachinidae